Acemya indica is a species of bristle fly in the family Tachinidae.

Distribution
India, Lesser Sunda Islands.

References

Exoristinae
Diptera of Asia
Insects described in 1968